Aundorach (Scottish Gaelic:) is a settlement one mile south of Loch Garten in Badenoch and Strathspey, Highland, Scotland.

References

Populated places in Badenoch and Strathspey